Ibrox subway station is a station serving the Ibrox area of Glasgow, Scotland. The station was known as Copland Road until 1977. The station's surface buildings were replaced during the Subway's modernisation programme, with the main entrance still located on Copland Road. The station now has a side platform arrangement for boarding the trains.

Particularly of note nearby is Ibrox Stadium, home of Rangers F.C. The station is extremely busy on matchdays, with an additional entrance on Woodville Street opening to accommodate the vastly increased volume of passenger traffic. However, the station is generally quiet at other times and records around 540,000 boardings per year.

Also nearby is Glasgow Science Centre, although SPT suggest that Cessnock station is the alighting point for the Science Centre, as it is closer.

Past passenger numbers 
 2004/05: 0.520 million annually
 2011/12: 0.510 million annually

References

Glasgow Subway stations
Govan
Railway stations in Great Britain opened in 1896
1896 establishments in Scotland